The Free Access to Law Movement (FALM) is the international movement and organization devoted to providing free online access to legal information such as case law, legislation, treaties, law reform proposals and legal scholarship. The movement began in 1992 with the creation of the Legal Information Institute (LII) by Thomas R. Bruce and Peter W. Martin at Cornell Law School. Some later FALM projects incorporate Legal Information Institute or LII in their names, usually prefixed by a national or regional identifier.

Membership 
The FALM website lists 63 active members as of July 2017, together with the coverage (geographical area or political grouping) for which each member provides databases, and the year in which it became a member of FALM, as well as links to member websites.

Declaration

In October 2002 the meeting of LIIs in Montreal at the 4th Law via Internet Conference, made the following declaration as a joint statement of their philosophy of access to law. There were some further modifications of the Declaration at the Sydney meeting of LIIs in 2003 and at the Paris meeting in 2004.

See also
 Comparative law wiki
 GikII
 Legal awareness
 Ravel Law
 RECAP

Notes

References 
 Galindo, F 'Free Access to the Law in Latin America: Brasil, Argentina, Mexico and Uruguay as Examples' in Peruginelli and Ragona (Eds), 2009
 Greenleaf, G 'Legal Information Institutes and the Free Access to Law Movement', GlobaLex website, February 2008 - This article includes brief histories of all FALM Members to 2008.
 Greenleaf G 'Free access to legal information, LIIs, and the Free Access to Law Movement', Chapter in Danner, R and Winterton, J (eds.) IALL International Handbook of Legal Information Management. Aldershot, Burlington VT: Ashgate, 2011 - This chapter updates information about some FALM members to 2011, but is not comprehensive.
 Peruginelli, G and Ragona, M Law via the Internet: Free Access, Quality of Information, Effectiveness of Rights (Proc.  IX International Conference 'Law via the Internet'), European Press Academic Publishing, Florence, 2009
 Poulin, D (2004) 'Open access to law in developing countries' First Monday vol. 9, no 12, 6 December 2004

External links 
 
 

 
Online law databases
Legal research
Case law databases